Four Craters Lava Field is a basaltic volcanic field located south east of Newberry Caldera in the U.S. state of Oregon. The volcanic field covers about 30 square kilometers. Four Pleistocene cinder cones are the source of the flows in the field and are aligned along a fissure trending N 30° W. The cones rise 75 to 120 meters above the flows and the distance between the northernmost and southernmost cones is about 3.5 kilometers.

Closely related to the Four Craters lava field is Crack-in-the-Ground located at the southwest corner of the field. The eruptions from the field were accompanied by a slight sinking of the older rock surface. This shallow, graben-like sink is about 3 kilometers wide and extends to the south into an old lake basin. Crack-in-the-Ground marks the western edge of this small, volcano-tectonic depression and is nearly 9 meters deep and over a meter wide. The crack is the result of a tension fracture along a hingeline produced by the draping of Green Mountain lava flows over the edge of upthrown side of the concealed fault zone.

References 
(archived)

Further reading 
 
 

Volcanic fields of Oregon
Landforms of Lake County, Oregon
Volcanic fields of the Great Basin section
Deschutes National Forest
Lava fields